The people's commune was the highest of three administrative levels in rural areas of the People's Republic of China during the period from 1958 to 1983, until they were replaced by townships. Communes, the largest collective units, were divided in turn into production brigades and production teams. The communes had governmental, political, and economic functions during the Cultural Revolution. The people's commune was commonly known for collectivizing living and working practices, especially during the Great Leap Forward. The scale of the commune and its ability to extract income from the rural population enabled commune administrations to invest in large-scale mechanization, infrastructure, and industrial projects. The communes did not, however, meet many of their long-term goals, such as facilitating the construction of socialism in the rural areas, liberating women from housework, and creating sustainable agriculture practices in the countryside. They ranged in number from 50,000 to 90,000.

History

Precedents and Collectivization in the Early PRC 
Before the people’s communes were established, the Chinese Communist Party had experimented with and promoted other, smaller forms of collectivized agriculture. Before 1949, landlords owned almost half of the land in rural China and leased it out to tenant farmers. Many farms were relatively small, family-operated enterprises. Farmers generally went through cycles of busyness during harvest season and relative idleness during off seasons. During the Civil War era and continuing into the early years of the People's Republic of China, the CCP implemented wide-ranging land reforms, attempted to identify and classify the rural population, and redistributed land from the landlords to the middle peasants and poor peasants to revolutionize the social structure of China. 

Rural collectivization began soon after the CCP announced its 1953 "general line for the transition to socialism." Over the next six years, collectivization took several incrementally progressing forms: mutual aid groups, primitive cooperatives, and people's communes. 

With state coordination, many families—up to 68 million by 1954—joined Mutual Aid Teams. These Mutual Aid Teams helped farming families coordinate the sharing of labor, farming technology, and other resources. Some Mutual Aid Teams also formed, or were consolidated into, Agricultural Producer Cooperatives (APCs), larger institutions at the village or subvillage level that pooled resources and collectively managed land. The APCs coordinated labor for agricultural work and infrastructure projects, and the APCs distributed income to each household based on how much land, labor, and other resources that household contributed to the collective. Key CCP leaders, especially Mao Zedong, sought further collectivization, as they believed that collectivization would lead to greater agricultural production and efficiency, as larger collectives could undertake larger infrastructural and environmental projects (such as irrigation works and land reclamation) and take advantage of economies of scale. Moreover, Mao also argued that collectivization, and the consequent rural modernization, would hasten the breakdown of “traditional” and “feudal” belief systems and relationships in the countryside. Accordingly, the state established Higher-Level Producer Cooperatives (HAPCs) in 1956, and by the end of the year, over 90 percent of China’s 500 million farmers had joined 746,000 HAPCs. The HAPCs were usually the size of a village and contained between five hundred and one thousand members. The HAPCs instituted a few key measures that would persist in the People’s Communes for decades thereafter. Instead of allocating income based on a household’s contributions, the HAPCs allocated income based on workpoints, which were determined, in theory, by the amount of labor a cooperative member had performed. The HAPCs also coordinated large infrastructure projects and awarded workpoints for the often arduous and dangerous labor involved. The HAPCs also created new administrative and economic issues, but the CCP proceeded with the collectivizing process.

In 1958, in the aftermath of the Hundred Flowers Campaign and Anti-Rightist Campaign, Mao Zedong shifted course from emphasizing economic growth toward emphasizing the rapid establishment of communism. Achieving communism, for Mao, also required economic growth but had to, at the same time, involve further collectivization and the elimination of old (or feudal) ways of living. Party propaganda outlets publicized an enormous collective in Xushui, Hebei as a “commune,” in which “peasant” households had given way to communal living, and people did not have to worry about money or food. Mao visited Xushui and similar larger, purportedly very productive units in Henan province and declared, “People’s communes are good.” Mao and his allies in the CCP leadership continued to promote the communes both in propaganda and party meetings, and the construction of communes quickly became party line and a central pillar of the Great Leap Forward.

As the Great Leap Forward got underway, the state consolidated HAPCs into about 26,000 communes, each containing on average 4,500 hectares of land, 24,000 people, and 5,200 households.  The sizes of different communes varied widely across different regions but they were consistently much larger than HAPCs had been, and the communes encompassed on average about thirty HAPCs and up to one hundred. The communes were supposed to be instrumental to the PRC’s goal of “surpassing Britain and catching up to the US” in steel production.

Ideological and economic motivations 
By calling these giant administrative and economic regions “People’s Communes” (人民公社), CCP leadership aligned itself with a socialist and communist idea of the “commune” as a relatively autonomous city or towns ruled by the working class and/or the agricultural producers. This idea was  first advocated by Robert Owen and later adapted by Friedrich Engels and Karl Marx. Above all, however, the CCP’s communes were defined by three main factors, especially during the Great Leap Forward: first, an emphasis on industrialization and productivity; second, a militarization of society, in which commune members were mobilized through military-style campaigns and exhorted to act with rigid discipline, devotion, and selflessness; and third, an ideal of self-reliance or local autonomy, such that each commune would be able to produce most of the supplies and technology that it needed to function. As the CCP Politburo declared at the 1958 Beidahe Conference, the communes were meant to bring together all key occupations and professions into one unit and, by merging them, bring about “socialist construction”:The establishment of people’s communes with all-round management of agriculture, forestry, animal husbandry, side occupations, and fishery, where industry (the worker), agriculture (the peasant), exchange (the trader), culture and education (the student), and military affairs (the militiaman) merge into one, is the fundamental policy to guide the peasant to accelerate socialist construction, complete the building of socialism ahead of time, and carry out the gradual transition to communism.By “socialist construction,” the resolution referred to the process in which the PRC was supposed to build up its industry under the vanguard Communist Party and, through the process of industrialization, accumulate enough capital and power to advance toward full communism—which, in this case, meant the self-rule of the proletariat and the distribution of wealth according to need, not ability or labor (see also: Primary stage of socialism). Mao hoped that the communes would create an “industrial army” out of the countryside, essentially turning the rural workforce into a well-disciplined engine of production. Other members of the CCP leadership were more wary of Mao’s plan for rapid agricultural modernization, and they pointed out the potentially prohibitive costs of this process and resources that it would require (such as iron, steel, and petroleum), and they argued that agricultural modernization might lead to unemployment given that rural workers would not necessarily be able to find other jobs in the countryside and urban industry remained relatively small. Nevertheless, Mao’s faction won out.

These debates, and the communes themselves, were oriented toward a fundamental question facing the Chinese economy in the 1950s: how could the PRC grow its industrial base when most of the population remained tied to agricultural work and small-scale sideline production for subsistence? The communes would require a great deal of coordination and at times coercion but would also, in theory, address this basic issue. By forcing people to move into these large units, the commune leadership could coordinate larger infrastructural and industrial projects more effectively, extract income from the commune residents, and allocate this capital income to the larger projects, which would in turn make the commune more productive and efficient and free up labor for further development. In essence, the goal of the people’s commune was to improve agricultural productivity such that fewer people had to work in agriculture and could instead use their energy and resources for industrialization.

In their first few years of existence, the communes created a wide range of economic, social, and administrative issues and exacerbated the Great Leap Forward famine. The CCP leadership then made major reforms to the commune structure after the Great Leap and again in the decades that followed in order to make them more stable, productive, and efficient. Regardless of the stated goals of the communes, however, the PRC economy at the time was not oriented toward the countryside. Most productive industry was already located in the cities, and urban residents—those with jobs in key enterprises and industries—were the best-paid and best-fed in the country. As a result, the communes existed, above all, to extract grain from the countryside to support both consumption and production in the cities, and to employ surplus population when the cities grew too large.

Communization proceeded on a largely voluntary basis, avoiding both the violence and sabotage that occurred during the Soviet collectivization. According to professor Lin Chun, China's collectivization proceeded smoothly because, unlike the Soviet experience, a network of state institutions already existed in the countryside.

Commune life

Layout and provision of services 
In their most ambitious Great-Leap form, the communes were supposed to make nearly all domestic labor (cooking, taking care of children, education, washing, etc.) communal. In the early stages of the Great Leap Forward, the communes supplied some goods and services for free, such that food in the communal dining halls would be available for whoever wanted it rather than allocated based on workpoints or one’s own household possessions. This system was known as “free supply.”

Mao also considered militias and military-style organization essential to the success of the communes, and he promoted communization as a process of “militarization, combatization, and disciplinization.” As Mao saw it, a spirit of militarized organization, sacrifice, dedication, and selflessness would enable the Chinese people to overcome production bottlenecks through sheer effort. Each commune had a “people’s militia,” a group of commune members who took on military-style roles, adopted military terminology, and were responsible for organizing the commune population, defending the commune, and ensuring that commune members followed directives and maintained appropriate political behavior. The height of militarized fervor subsided after the Great Leap Forward, but the “people’s militias” continued to shape commune life and organization thereafter, especially during the Cultural Revolution.

During the Great Leap Forward, the process of bringing people into the communes, or communization, successfully uprooted traditional ways of farming and living but often failed to replace them with viable or productive alternatives. People had to give up their personal belongings, including everyday items such as farming and kitchen tools to smelt in “backyard steel furnaces.” These items were supposed to be useless scrap materials, but cadres and other zealous commune members encouraged people to contribute more and more items, to the extent that some communities melted down all of their pots and pans. The resulting steel and iron was mostly useless, and people who had to make steel could not spend as much time working in the fields. When, for a variety of structural and environmental factors (see also: Great Leap Forward), a larger famine set in, this shift from agricultural work to unproductive industrial labor only worsened conditions in the communes.

Some communes, such as the Macheng commune in Hubei (which was held up as a “model commune” at the national level, see also: Macheng), also demolished tens of thousands of private residences in order to bring about collective living arrangements and improve production efficiency. Macheng commune leaders also destroyed gravesites in order to open up more land for cultivation. Such destruction, the relative lack of compensation, and the lack of actual production increases all made the communization process incredibly disruptive and even deadly. In Raoyang Village in Hebei Province, the communization process also alienated villagers as cadres ended the temple fair, destroyed temples, cut back on traditional opera, and forced the local market to mostly close, all of which prevented villagers from engaging in traditional rites and celebrations. In the process of enforcing these new regulations, some cadres also abused their power and assaulted or humiliated villagers.

Communes were supposed to rationalize the working lives of rural residents, for example by spacing out new residential areas evenly rather than adhering to traditional village boundaries. With these new spatial plans, commune administrations aimed to reduce the amount of walking time required for farmers to get to their fields. But, in the frenzied and militarized atmosphere of the Great Leap Forward, rural residents were organized into “production armies” and might spend most of their time walking around between work sites, as they were tasked with too many different non-agricultural projects at once.

Conditions varied widely from commune to commune. The most immediate constraint on communal “free supply” was the availability of resources and the commune members’ willingness to participate in the new collective institutions. Commune members had a range of reasons to resist or express discontent with the communization process, largely due to either the inadequacies and inefficiencies of the commune system itself or the disruptive and destructive process by which the communes were first created. Some issues that arose for commune members included: overwork on non-agricultural projects (at the expense of subsistence-oriented farming), inefficient or counterproductive infrastructure projects (such as the backyard furnaces), lack of food at the communal dining halls, negligent educational and childcare services which created additional housework burdens for women, excessive and obligatory political study sessions, and confusing incentive structures for production.  Additionally, because markets were closed and sideline industries were banned, people could not turn to some of the traditional methods of dealing with economic and agricultural hardship.

Despite these instances of resistance, there were no large-scale uprisings against the commune system as a whole. Scholars such as Joshua Eisenman have argued that this lack of massive resistance indicates that the commune system, with its post-Great Leap Forward adjustments, ended up serving the basic purposes of, first, feeding the countryside, and, second, extracting enough income from rural residents to fund modernizing projects and free up labor.  Restrictions on individuals’ mobility, however, would have made it extremely difficult for potential dissidents to coordinate resistance to the communes at a regional or provincial level, and the Anti-Rightist Movement had severely undermined people’s willingness to openly criticize the party.

The conditions on communes varied considerably by geographic location. Different provincial administrations were more or less zealous in pursuing communization. Different provinces also did not have the same resources at their disposal for communization, and the Great Leap famine’s severity depended on local weather, grain extraction for exports (or requisitioning for internal trade), and the response or lack thereof from local officials.  At the commune level, variation might also depend on the local geography or the layout that the commune organizers preferred. For example, some communes Panyu people's commune in Guangdong province were organized around a central spatial axis such as a main road or a mountain range, and residences were built near the main production facilities. Other communes were built instead with a focus on public facilities such as canteens, performance spaces, and community centers. These differences in spatial organization could then affect the daily lives of commune residents, as they might spend more time working on industrial projects as opposed to in political or cultural meetings, or, depending on the layout of their commune, they might spend additional time transiting between the two.

The communes also changed shape considerably over time. To address some of the early shortcomings, the central leadership quickly adopted major reforms. During the Great Leap, the leadership revised the free supply system back into a labor-based system of distribution. In 1961, the average size of the communes was reduced to one-third of the original, and the basic accounting unit (i.e., the unit at which productivity was measured and work points were allocated) devolved from the commune to the brigade to, in 1962, the production team. In the aftermath of the Great Leap Forward, as Mao Zedong retreated from guiding the economic course of the PRC, other members of the leadership enacted additional reforms to the commune. Particularly important was the reintroduction of the “Three Freedoms”: private household plots, sideline industries, and small-scale animal husbandry. These “freedoms” enabled commune residents to maintain some basic subsistence measures outside of their commune work, and, as the communes became more efficient, commune residents were increasingly able to spend more time developing their own projects. Newly built communes did not retain the collectivized living arrangements and allowed for separate family spaces, even if residents still lived in large, central complexes.

Urban communes 
During the Great Leap Forward, the CPC central leadership also pushed cities to create communes of their own, modeled on the one set up in Zhengzhou, Henan. As with the rural communes, the urban communes were supposed to improve production and social cohesion by: collectivizing living arrangements and socializing domestic labor (i.e., making housework collective in order to free up female labor for other work); combining many different social, economic, cultural, and political institutions in the same space (i.e., the commune); and thereby pushing the PRC forward on the road to socialism. As the CCP Central Committee put it,The urban people’s commune will be the tool for transforming old cities into new socialist cities and the organizer of production, exchange, distribution and welfare in people’s lives, as well as the social organization which would combine industrial, agricultural, military, educational and trade circles and eventually merge government administration with commune management.Production and labor, especially female labor, were essential to these “socialist cities,” as the first Zhengzhou Commune statute made clear: the commune would “[push] forward the elimination of private property and the complete liberation of productive forces, in particular women’s productive force.” To view the communes as liberatory, the CCP leadership had to assume that the labor women already did inside and outside the home was not sufficiently or meaningfully productive, and that the act of working in factories or other industrial projects would free women from patriarchal household structures.

The urban communes did create new communal institutions and these institutions garnered some popularity, but the main outcome of the urban communes in the short run was—in addition to new services—disorder, inefficiency, and frustration. According to official statistics from 1960, the urban communes created: 53,000 public canteens, 50,000 nurseries, and 55,000 service centers that provided for other daily needs (such as laundry, repairing, and cleaning).  The boundaries between workers and managers were loosened and the welfare benefits associated with a work unit (danwei) were extended to migrants and women through a large employment program. Such changes represented an enormous expansion of urban welfare benefits, in contrast with the relatively restricted welfare policy the PRC pursued before and after this period.

The communes, and the state as a whole, were not able to sustain such expansion either financially or organizationally. At the same time, the members of the communes, as in the countryside, were mobilized to achieve huge production quotas and other political and manual work. The urban communes were relatively productive, even with some waste and overproduction, but in cities such as Beijing and Shanghai, people began to complain that the commune services were subpar or incompetent and the work was excessive (especially for women who often continued to have to do housework), and the expenditure on welfare made the communes unprofitable as a whole. By late 1961, many people in these cities had stopped using commune services, and the communes closed down some of their amenities. Ultimately, although the communes were economically unsustainable and socially disruptive, some city residents lamented their closure, as they had provided jobs or amenities that the existing, more limited welfare system did not.

In addition to the failure of the communes to provide the services they had intended to collectivize, the urban communes also ran up against economic issues surrounding housing and urban construction. Three developments were particularly important: first, during the Great Leap Forward, a large proportion of public funding was allocated for capital construction (e.g., factories, mines) rather than housing construction, and so cities had relatively little money with which to construct new, durable housing. Second, the construction of housing was especially pressing because the Great Leap Forward had freed up a great deal of the rural workforce to move into the cities to work in industry, leading to a shock of urbanization. And third, Great Leap-era plans for urban construction were highly ambitious, both in the scope of construction and the economizing techniques that builders were supposed to rely on, given that more resources were being directed to industrial projects. Thus, Great Leap Forward policies exacerbated demand for new urban housing but did not provide funding to meet that demand and instead pushed the construction projects to rely on non-industrial materials (such as bricks) and the recycling of materials, either from demolished buildings or leftover from other projects. The idea that urban communes would both promote production and reorganize living space within the same institutions ran up against an economic contradiction, namely that Great Leap policies provided resources for the former (production) but not the latter (living space). Hence, when the central leadership decided to address the economic crisis, one of the major steps they took to lessen the cost of welfare provision was to lay off urban workers and step up the process of "ruralization," sending these workers to the countryside.

Unlike the rural communes, the urban ones did not last after the Great Leap Forward. The urban communes, however, still had lasting effects on urban planning, as, for example, with the Beijing city plan of 1958. This plan featured radical changes to the urban landscape, including an emphasis on communal construction and the destruction of walls, and, although the central leadership never officially approved this plan, urban planners continued relying on it up until the Cultural Revolution.  The urban communes also represented the peak of the PRC's urban welfare provision, and the economic untenability of this system led the CCP leadership to enact policies reinforcing and sharpening the rural-urban divide.

In the people's commune, many things were shared. Private kitchens became redundant, and in some counties items in the private kitchen such as tables, chairs, cooking utensils and pans were contributed to the commune's kitchen. Private cooking was discouraged and supplanted by communal dining.

Impact 
The rural cooperative movement replaced village power structures influenced by kinship and community elites with a formalized administrative system. The process linked families and individuals to national policies, creating what academic Cai Xiang describes as a new social space. 

Collective labor created possibilities from women to leave the home and increase their personal and economic independence. 

During the Great Leap Forward, the communes contributed to the widespread famine conditions, as the communes overworked their residents, confiscated necessary everyday items, and misallocated labor and resources on unproductive projects over basic foodstuffs. With the adjustments made to the communes after the Great Leap, however, they did contribute to the PRC’s relatively substantial growth in agricultural productivity over the remaining years before decollectivization. The work point system did not always provide clear incentive structures for commune workers but the value of the work points was calculated in such a way that the commune took roughly half the laborer’s income before they turned the work points into material goods. Using this extracted capital, the communes were able to invest in mechanization, infrastructure, irrigation, soil reclamation, and other large-scale projects that required large amounts of investment and labor. Moreover, the communes continued to provide some basic services such as education and health services, and the industrial projects built on some communes gave commune members technical skills they would not have gotten otherwise.

The communes also had lasting negative effects. The experiences associated with communization and the Great Leap Forward created lasting traumas for whole communities and especially the women who were responsible for taking on additional labor and were often the first in a family to go hungry. Destruction of gravesites made it difficult for families to continue forms of ancestor worship that they had been practicing for centuries, even after the Great Leap ended. Some of the land reclamation and irrigation projects successfully made agricultural land more productive, but the top-down nature of the commune structure often meant that commune or brigade leadership determined these projects without consulting the commune members on whether these projects were useful to them. Moreover, some of the projects that communes undertook to make their land more productive, such as the use of pesticides and chemical experiments, could also have deleterious long-term effects on the environment and the local population.

During the years between the end of the Great Leap Forward and decollectivization in the early 1980s, the PRC’s agricultural productivity, rural school enrollment, infant mortality rates, and life expectancy all improved. Collectivization of land via the commune system also facilitated China's rapid industrialization by through the state's control of food production and procurement. This allowed the state to accelerate the process of capital accumulation, ultimately laying the successful foundation of physical and human capital for the economic growth of China's reform and opening up.

Gallery

See also
Work unit, China
Chinese Peasants' Association
Nanjie, reported to be the last Maoist village in China

Notes

References and further reading
 Yang, Dali. Calamity and Reform in China: State, Rural Society, and Institutional Change since the Great Leap Famine. Stanford University Press, 1996.
 
 

Economic history of the People's Republic of China
Campaigns of the Chinese Communist Party
Maoist China
Housing in China
Articles containing video clips
Administrative divisions of China
20th century in China
Great Leap Forward